Ruby Ray may refer to:

Ruby Ray (photographer) (born 1952), American photographer
Ruby Ray (actress) (1881–after 1973), English stage actress